The rural cemetery, or garden cemetery, is a style of cemetery that became popular in the United States and Europe in the mid-nineteenth century. This article is a list of rural cemeteries in the United States.

Footnotes

References
 
 
 
 

List of Rural Cemeteries